Apion rubens is a species of seed weevil native to Europe.

References

External links
Images representing Apion at BOLD

Brentidae
Beetles described in 1839
Beetles of Europe